Fantôme was a French animation studio which produced arguably the first regular CG animated TV series, Insektors in 1994. The company shut down in late 1999.

References

French animation studios